Lepisanthes alata, also called the Johore tree, blimbing cina, ceri or engkili, is a species of flowering plant, a tropical forest fruit-tree in the lychee family, that is native to Southeast Asia.

Description
The species grows as a small monoecious tree to 5–15 m in height. The pinnate leaves have 5–13 pairs of usually sessile, lance-shaped to oblong leaflets. The pendulous inflorescences bear wine-red to purple flowers. The glossy oval fruits are drupes 2–4 cm long by 2–3 cm in diameter, red to purple when ripe, each containing two seeds in an edible, sweet, white mesocarp.

Distribution and habitat
The species is found to Borneo. It occurs in mixed hill forest at elevations of up to 1,000 m.

References

 
alata
Flora of Borneo
Fruits originating in Asia
Plants described in 1849
Taxa named by Carl Ludwig Blume